Gastrolobium brevipes is a shrub that is endemic to the Central Ranges region of Western Australia, Northern Territory and South Australia. It is a member of the family Fabaceae, grows to 2.5 metres high and produces orange red pea-flowers in July.

Taxonomy
The species was first formally described in 1983 botanist Michael Crisp and the description was published in the Kew Bulletin
as well as Australian Systematic Botany.

Distribution and habitat
It is found in the IBRA region of the Central Ranges, mainly the George Gill and MacDonnell Ranges. The habitat is on dunefields.  sandy gravelly soils or rock soils, or dry watercourses.

References

brevipes
Rosids of Western Australia
Endemic flora of Western Australia
Plants described in 1983
Taxa named by Michael Crisp